The Road to Mandalay is a 2016 internationally co-produced drama film directed by Midi Z. The film premiered at the 73rd edition of the Venice Film Festival  in the Venice Days section, in which it was awarded the Fedeora Award for Best Film. It was also screened in the Contemporary World Cinema section at the 2016 Toronto International Film Festival.

Plot 
A Young Burmese girl, Lien Ching (Wu Ke-xi), smuggles herself in a truck heading for Bangkok, Thailand, aiming to pursue a better life, and eventually even go to Taiwan for better opportunities. In Bangkok she meets A-kuo (Kai Ko), a boy from the same Burmese hometown Lashio, who was less ambitious but pragmatic and had a crush on her.

Lacking proper identification, Liang struggles to find legitimate work and gets arrested as an illegal immigrant by the Thai authorities. She is fined and has to rely on A-kuo's help. Lien Ching becomes desperate to obtain legal paperwork, even if it is fraudulent.

After several failed attempts on the papers and losing money, she finally accepts a solution offered by a drug dealer who requires a huge sum of money. In order to collect the amount, Lien Ching prostitutes herself. This act enrages A-kuo, who has been supporting her.

Lien Ching makes enough money to gain passage into Thailand, while A-kuo remains short. One night shortly before her planned departure, A-kuo jealously murders Lien Ching.

Cast
 Kai Ko as A-kuo 
 Wu Ke-xi as Lien Ching

Awards and nominations

References

External links
 

2016 films
2016 drama films
Taiwanese drama films
French drama films
German drama films
2010s Mandarin-language films
2010s Burmese-language films
Films directed by Midi Z
Myanmar–Thailand relations
Burmese diaspora
Immigration to Thailand
Burmese drama films
2016 multilingual films
Taiwanese multilingual films
French multilingual films
German multilingual films
2010s French films
2010s German films